Andrew Daniel Comyn (23 September 1872 – 23 May 1949) was an Irish cricketer. He was a right-handed batsman and a leg-break bowler.

He played for Ireland 16 times between 1893 and 1904, making his debut against a Combined Services team. Four of these matches were first-class matches in 1902. He also played four first-class matches for Dublin University in 1895.

His brother-in-law and two nephews also played cricket for Ireland.

References

1872 births
1949 deaths
Irish cricketers
Dublin University cricketers
Sportspeople from County Galway